Jimmy D. "Jungle" Anderson (September 6, 1953 – December 5, 2008) was an American professional rodeo bullfighter.

Born in Fort Worth, Texas, Anderson originally raced horses until he grew past the size of the average jockey. He later became a bullfighter and barrelman and took part in his first rodeo in 1975. He took part in several events including the Canadian Finals Rodeo, National Finals Rodeo and Professional Bull Riders (PBR) World Finals. He retired after the 2001 PBR World Finals. In April 2007 he was inducted into the Texas Rodeo Cowboy Hall of Fame.

Anderson's professional bullfighting career spanned 32 years, and he was described as one of the "original bullfighters" on the PBR tour.

He was known for his distinctive purple cowboy hat with plastic bull horns and red wig while performing during the latter years of his career, and was among the last few PBR bullfighters to wear clown make-up and baggy outfits before they switched to wearing sport jerseys and shorts in 2003.

Anderson died of heart disease on December 5, 2008.

References

1953 births
2008 deaths
Rodeo clowns
Sportspeople from Fort Worth, Texas